Electric universe may refer to:

 Electric Universe (album), the 1983 studio album by Earth, Wind & Fire
 Electric Universe,  a psychedelic trance music group from Germany
 Any of a number of outside-the-mainstream proposals regarding astrophysics; see, for example, Plasma cosmology
 Electric Universe: How Electricity Switched On the Modern World, a book by science writer David Bodanis